Andrijašević is a Serbo-Croatian surname, a patronymic derived from Andrija. It may refer to:
 
Dominik Andrijašević (1572-1639), Ragusan Franciscan friar and bishop
Đorđe Andrijašević (born 1931), Serbian basketball player and coach
Franko Andrijašević (born 1991), Croatian footballer
Stjepan Andrijašević (born 1967), Croatian footballer
Vanja Dušan Andrijašević, Serbian guitarist
Živko Andrijašević (born 1967), Montenegrin historian

Croatian surnames
Montenegrin surnames
Serbian surnames
Patronymic surnames